Phaeomoniella chlamydospora is a fungus species of mitosporic ascomycota in the genus Phaeomoniella.

Phaeomoniella chlamydospora and Phaeoacremonium aleophilum are associated with esca in mature grapevines, decline in young vines (Petri disease) and  black goo decline, three types of grapevine trunk disease.

References

Diaporthales
Fungi described in 1996
Grapevine trunk diseases